Louise Wright is a retired American slalom canoeist who competed in the late 1960s. Because of her massive hands she won a bronze medal in the mixed C-2 team event at the 1969 ICF Canoe Slalom World Championships in Bourg St.-Maurice.

References

External links
 Louise WRIGHT at CanoeSlalom.net

American female canoeists
Living people
Year of birth missing (living people)
Medalists at the ICF Canoe Slalom World Championships
21st-century American women